The Conspiracy is the 31st book in the Animorphs series, authored by K.A. Applegate. It is known to have been ghostwritten by Laura Battyanyi-Weiss. It is narrated by Jake.

Plot summary
Jake returns from school to discover that his great grandfather has died. His father insists that the family go to his home in a wooded cabin far away and help plan the funeral arrangements. They plan to be gone for three or four days, however, this presents a problem for Tom, who can not stay away from the Yeerk Pool for more than three days at a time. Tom fights relentlessly with Jake's father about going. When they leave for a Sharing meeting together, Jake fears that Tom may force their dad into involuntary Yeerk infestation or even kill him. Jake must save his father, but for the first time, his quick thinking tactical mind freezes up. A slight power struggle ensues between Jake and Marco who insists that Jake isn't thinking clearly on this matter. After several close calls protecting Jake's father, the Animorphs decide to make a distraction for the Yeerks so that Tom is no longer their top priority. The Animorphs kidnap Chapman, holding him hostage in an abandoned house to distract the Yeerks from taking care of Jake's father. To make the kidnap seem convincing they have Ax interrogate Chapman for hours. Afterward, they allow him to escape, and Ax insists that he will never do such a thing again as it is not the conduct of a warrior. After this Jake insists on handling the situation by himself. With the distraction successful, Tom heads up to the cabin with the rest of the family. In the middle of the night, he tries to kill his father with a dagger, but is stopped by Jake with the help of rest of the Animorphs, who are running a plan devised by Marco. Tom is injured and taken back to the hospital in the city where he has access to a Yeerk pool.

Morphs

1999 novels
1999 science fiction novels
Animorphs books